Sarang is an alternative school on a hill top started by a teacher couple, Gopalakrishnan and Vijayalakshmi in Agali Panchayath in  Attappady, Palakkad district, Kerala, India. The school's curriculum includes organic farming, art forms and environmental conservation among other subjects.

External links

References

Schools in Palakkad district